The OFC Women's Nations Cup (previously known as the OFC Women's Championship) is a women's association football tournament for national teams who belong to the Oceania Football Confederation (OFC). It was held every three years from 1983 to 1989. Currently, the tournament is held at irregular intervals. Of the 12 tournaments that have been held, New Zealand won six of them.

The competition has served as a qualifying tournament for the FIFA Women's World Cup since 1991. In 2007, the competition took place in Papua New Guinea for the second time. Tonga and the Solomon Islands each took part for the first time in the four-team event, which was plagued by withdrawals from six squads.

The most recent edition was played in July 2022 in Fiji and was won by Papua New Guinea for the first time.

Only four nations have won the trophy: Australia (3 times), New Zealand (6 times), Chinese Taipei (2 times), and Papua New Guinea (1 time).

Australia ceased to be a member of the OFC on January 1, 2006, having elected to join the Asian Football Confederation (AFC), and hence no longer participate in the tournament.

History

First Tournaments (1983–1989)
The OFC Women's Nations Cup started in 1983 (as the OFC Women's Championship). The first edition took place in New Caledonia, and was won by New Zealand, after defeating Australia 3–2 in Nouméa. New Caledonia and Fiji also participated in this edition.

New Zealand hosted the second edition in 1986, won by guests Chinese Taipei, after beating Australia 4–1. A second New Zealand team also played in this tournament.

Chinese Taipei won again in 1989, on Australian soil, against New Zealand. This edition marked the debut of Papua New Guinea, who lost all of its games.

First World Cup qualifiers (1991–1995)
The tournament returned in 1991, again in Australia; with only three teams: the hosts, New Zealand and Papua New Guinea. This competition also served as the qualifying process for the 1991 FIFA Women's World Cup. New Zealand finished first and qualified for the World Cup.

In 1995, Papua New Guinea was the host. This edition featured the same teams from the previous edition. Australia won the tournament this time and qualified for the 1995 FIFA Women's World Cup in Sweden.

1998 to today
The American Samoa and Samoa made their debuts in 1998. This time, the competition took place in Australia, and was won by them. The country won again in 2003. This was their last participation on the championship before moving to the Asian Football Confederation in 2006.

The following editions were all won by New Zealand, with Papua New Guinea in the second place.

Results
The top four placed teams so far were: 

Notes

Teams reaching the top four

Participating nations
A total of 15 teams have participated in the tournament, including all 11 current full OFC members (associate members are not allowed entry). Additionally, former OFC members Australia and Chinese Taipei previously participated. The secondary teams of Australia and New Zealand also each participated once.

India were set to enter the 1989 tournament as invited guests, but withdrew after being refused permission to participate by the Indian government.
Legend
 – Champions
 – Runners-up
 – Third place
 – Fourth place
GS – Group stage
Q – Qualified
 – Did not qualify
 – Withdrew

 — Hosts

Notes

Records and statistics

References

External links
 
Oceania Cup (Women) at the RSSSF

 
Oceania Football Confederation competitions for women's national teams
Recurring sporting events established in 1983
Oceanian championships